Berosus is a genus of beetles in the family Hydrophilidae, the water scavenger beetles. The genus contains 273 species. It is distributed worldwide.

Beetles of this genus are aquatic, with most living in ponds and other marshy habitat types.

Diversity
Species include:
 Berosus aculeatus LeConte, 1855
 Berosus affinis Brullé, 1835
 Berosus apure Oliva, 2002
 Berosus arnetti Van Tassell, 1990
 Berosus atlanticus Queney, 2007
 Berosus blechrus Leech, 1948
 Berosus chevrolati Zaitzev, 1908
 Berosus corrini Wooldridge, 1964
 Berosus degallieri Queney, 2010
 Berosus duquefi Queney, 2006
 Berosus dolerosus Leech, 1948
 Berosus exiguus Say, 1825
 Berosus fischeri Schödl, 1993
 Berosus fraternus LeConte, 1855
 Berosus guyanensis Queney, 2006
 Berosus hatchi Miller, 1965
 Berosus hoplites Sharp, 1887
 Berosus infuscatus LeConte, 1855
 Berosus ingeminatus Orchymont, 1946
 Berosus interstitialis Knisch, 1924
 Berosus maculosus Mannerheim, 1853
 Berosus metalliceps Sharp, 1882
 Berosus miles LeConte, 1855
 Berosus moerens Sharp, 1882
 Berosus nigricollis Hebauer, 2006
 Berosus notopeltatus Van Tassell, 1963
 Berosus olivae Queney, 2006
 Berosus ordinatus LeConte, 1855
 Berosus oregonensis Miller, 1965
 Berosus pantherinus LeConte, 1855
 Berosus peregrinus Herbst, 1797
 Berosus pugnax LeConte, 1863
 Berosus punctatissimus LeConte, 1855
 Berosus quadridens Chevrolat, 1863
 Berosus rugulosus Horn, 1873
 Berosus salvini Sharp, 1882
 Berosus sayi Hansen, 1999
 Berosus spiniger Queney, 2010
 Berosus stylifer Horn, 1873
 Berosus trilobus Chevrolat, 1863
 Berosus truncatipennis Castelnau, 1840
 Berosus tayouanus Ueng, Wang & Wang, 2007
 Berosus undatus Fabricius, 1792
 Berosus youngi Wooldridge, 1964
Additional Australian species:

 Berosus arcus 
 Berosus juxtadiscolor 
 Berosus macropunctatus 
 Berosus niger 
 Berosus quadrapunctatus 
 Berosus ralphi 
 Berosus reardoni 
 Berosus sarahae 
 Berosus timmsi 
 Berosus trishae 
 Berosus wadeae 
 Berosus amoenus 
 Berosus aquilo 
 Berosus dallasae 
 Berosus gibbae 
 Berosus josephenae 
 Berosus nicholasi 
 Berosus sadieae 
 Berosus sonjae 
 erosus veronicae 
 Berosus vijae

References

External links
 Berosus on Encyclopedia of Life
 

Hydrophilidae genera
Hydrophilinae